Claude-Nicolas Le Cat (6 September 1700 – 20 August 1768) was a French surgeon and science communicator.

Biography
Le Cat was born in Blérancourt (Picardy). He was the son of Claude Le Cat, a surgeon, and Anne-Marie Méresse, the daughter of a surgeon. He studied anatomy and surgery first with his father then in Paris from 1726.

In 1728, he was appointed surgeon to the Archbishop of Rouen Louis de La Vergne-Montenard de Tressan, friend of Louis XV, then in 1731 deputy head surgeon at the Hôtel-Dieu hospital in Rouen when he was not yet Master surgeon.

He obtained his medical doctorate in Reims University in 1733, then became next year Master surgeon in Rouen.

He commenced lecturing on anatomy and surgery, and in 1736 received the title of royal professor and demonstrator. In 1744 he founded the "Académie royale des sciences, belles lettres et arts" in Rouen, becoming its lifelong secretary for the class of sciences and arts.

In 1742, he married Marie-Marguerite Champossin. Their only daughter, Charlotte-Bonne, married the surgeon Jean-Pierre David (fr), who succeeded Le Cat in all his offices.

Louis XV granted him the rank of écuyer in 1762 in recognition of his services.

He was a devout Catholic throughout his life. He died in Rouen in 1768 aged 67.

Works
In 1731, his interest in replicating human anatomical forms and movements stimulated Vaucanson to begin work on his first automaton.

In 1732, he performed lateral lithotomy approach to removing bladder stones using the technique invented by Frère Jacques Beaulieu and improved by William Cheselden. He developed an instrument for lithotomy, the "Gorgeret cystotome". Le Cat deserve credit for the first removal of bladder polyp through the dilated urethra.

He also effected a great advance in cataract surgery.

His reputation in France and Europe is reflected by his numerous academy prizes, publications, and surgical notoriety.

Bibliography

References

1700 births
1768 deaths
French anatomists
French urologists
French ophthalmologists
French surgeons
French Roman Catholics